The Adventurer is an album by saxophonist Clifford Jordan which was recorded in New York City in 1978 and first released on the Muse label.

Reception

AllMusic reviewer Ron Wynn described the album as being "Steady, with consistently interesting and gripping solos".

Track listing 
All compositions by Clifford Jordan, except as indicated.
 "He's a Hero"5:19
 "Quasimodo" (Charlie Parker)7:08
 "No More" (Tutti Camarata, Bob Russell)4:54  
 "Blues for Muse"5:06
 "Adventurer"6:49
 "I'll Be Around" (Alec Wilder)5:55

Personnel 
Clifford Jordantenor saxophone, alto saxophone, flute
Tommy Flanaganpiano
Bill Leebass
Grady Tatedrums

References 

1980 albums
Clifford Jordan albums
Muse Records albums